Alofi is the capital of the Pacific Ocean island nation of Niue. With a population of 597 in 2017, Alofi has the distinction of being the second smallest national capital city in terms of population (after Ngerulmud, capital of Palau). It consists of the two villages: Alofi North and Alofi South where the government headquarters are located.

History
In January 2004, Niue was hit by the fierce tropical storm Cyclone Heta which killed two people and did extensive damage to the entire island. Many of Alofi's buildings were destroyed, including the hospital. This site is still within the village boundaries of Alofi South.

Geography

Overview
It is located at the centre of Alofi Bay on the west coast of the island, close to the only break in the coral reef that surrounds Niue. The bay stretches for 30% of the island's length (about seven kilometres) from Halagigie Point in the south to Makapu Point in the north.

The council's territory borders with Avatele, Hakupu, Lakepa, Liku, Makefu, Mutalau, Tamakautoga and Tuapa.

Climate

Alofi features a tropical rainforest climate under the Köppen climate classification, with no discernible dry season. The city has a noticeably drier stretch from June through September.

Transport
The town is serviced by Niue International Airport, and there are numerous roads, both paved and dirt, that crisscross the town.

The island's main seaport is Sir Roberts Wharf. It is a small wharf, capable – due to the island's topography — of only handling smaller flat-bottomed boats. Larger cargo vessels and fishing boats moor near the reef, and barges are used to offload cargo. Major strengthening, extension work, and renovations to the wharf were commissioned in 2020, after cyclone damage earlier in the year.

Personalities
Dalton Tagelagi (b. 1968), politician
Sam Pata Emani Tagelagi (1935–2011), politician

See also
Niue High School
List of villages in Niue
Huanaki Cultural Centre & Museum
List of national capitals

References

Notes

Sources

External links

 History of Niue
 Cyclone aftermath pictures

 
Capitals in Oceania
Populated places in Niue